Chris Tomic (born 1978) is a German computer scientist, inventor, entrepreneur and a reality TV personality. He has featured in several television shows, mostly on the German news channel N-TV Television.

Life 
After his studies in Germany at the Heinrich-Heine-Universität Düsseldorf, he started developing technologies for the internet and mobile industry in Düsseldorf with the company Novadoc GmbH until 2001.

Tomic created the UCP protocol and set the standard for the worldwide first delivery of binary messages to mobile handsets such as operator-logos and monophonic ringtones in 1998. As executive director of the company Novadoc GmbH he focused his research and development on secure mobile payments and micropayments over SMS (Mobile Payments). In 2001 he became the CTO of the company MonsterMob LTD in the UK.

Development of the company Monstermob LTD 
In 2003 MonsterMob LTD was floated on the London Stock Exchange with an opening market capitalisation of £32m. Spanish internet firm LaNetro Zed bought up a majority 53% stake in the business.

The agreement will mean LaNetro Zed and MonsterMob LTD will together become the world's largest company in the Mobile Value-Added Services (MVAS) market in terms of revenue. The enlarged company is now operating in 31 countries around the world employing 1,200 staff.

Filmography

References

External links 
 Website of Chris Tomic
 

1978 births
Living people
Engineers from Krefeld
German billionaires
21st-century German inventors
German computer scientists
Computer hardware engineers
Computer designers
Programming language designers
Cellular automatists
German television personalities
Mass media people from North Rhine-Westphalia